Mortlake is a district of London

Mortlake may also refer to:
Mortlake, New South Wales, a suburb of Sydney, Australia
Mortlake, Victoria, a small town in the Western District of Victoria, Australia
Mortlake, Connecticut, a historical place name in the United States

See also
Mortlach (disambiguation)